The Philatelic Record was an important early philatelic magazine published in 36 volumes between February 1879 and 1914. It was originally published by Pemberton, Wilson and Company of London and later by Buhl & Company when it was merged with The Stamp News to form The Philatelic Record and Stamp News, under the editorship of Edward J. Nankivell. It reverted to its original title when it was taken over by Sir Isaac Pitman and Sons.

See also
The Stamp-Collector's Magazine

References

External links
 
Complete digitised archive of The Philatelic Record at Smithsonian Libraries

1879 establishments in the United Kingdom
Philatelic periodicals
1914 disestablishments in the United Kingdom
Magazines established in 1879
Magazines disestablished in 1914
English-language magazines
Defunct magazines published in the United Kingdom
Magazines published in London